Oronoco is a city in Olmsted County, Minnesota, United States, along the Middle Fork of the Zumbro River. The population was 1,802 at the 2020 census.

History
The city was named by early settler Dr. Hector Galloway  after the Orinoco, a large river in South America. A village was founded in 1854 and platted in 1855. The village incorporated as a city on March 6, 1968. Oronoco Township, which is adjacent on three sides, was organized in 1858. It is a bedroom community for nearby Rochester.

Geography

Demographics

2010 census
As of the census of 2010, there were 1,300 people, 451 households, and 357 families living in the city. The racial makeup of the city was 95.2% White, 0.2% African American, 0.2% Native American, 3.0% Asian, 0.2% Pacific Islander, 0.5% from other races, and 0.8% from two or more races. Hispanic or Latino of any race were 0.5% of the population.

There were 451 households, of which 45.5% had children under the age of 18 living with them, 69.6% were married couples living together, 5.5% had a female householder with no husband present, 4.0% had a male householder with no wife present, and 20.8% were non-families. 16.9% of all households were made up of individuals, and 5.1% had someone living alone who was 65 years of age or older. The average household size was 2.87 and the average family size was 3.25.

The median age in the city was 36 years. 31.7% of residents were under the age of 18; 4.9% were between the ages of 18 and 24; 28.3% were from 25 to 44; 27.2% were from 45 to 64; and 8.1% were 65 years of age or older. The gender makeup of the city was 50.1% male and 49.9% female.

2000 census
As of the census of 2000, there were 883 people, 335 households, and 253 families living in the city. The racial makeup of the city was 97.40% White, 0.11% Native American, 1.13% Asian, 0.11% Pacific Islander, 0.11% from other races, and 1.13% from two or more races. Hispanic or Latino of any race were 1.81% of the population.

There were 335 households, out of which 33.7% had children under the age of 18 living with them, 65.7% were married couples living together, 6.0% had a female householder with no husband present, and 24.2% were non-families. 18.5% of all households were made up of individuals, and 6.3% had someone living alone who was 65 years of age or older.  The average household size was 2.64 and the average family size was 3.00.

In the city, the population was spread out, with 25.9% under the age of 18, 6.3% from 18 to 24, 33.5% from 25 to 44, 25.8% from 45 to 64, and 8.4% who were 65 years of age or older.  The median age was 38 years. For every 100 females, there were 105.3 males.  For every 100 females age 18 and over, there were 105.7 males.

The median income for a household in the city was $67,656, and the median income for a family was $72,396. Males had a median income of $47,153 versus $35,694 for females. The per capita income for the city was $27,965.  About 0.8% of families and 2.1% of the population were below the poverty line, including 4.3% of those under age 18 and none of those age 65 or over.

Infrastructure

Transportation
U.S. Highway 52 serves as a main route in the community.

References

External links
Oronoco, Minnesota Virtual Community Center
City of Oronco Minnesota Website
City-Data.com
ePodunk: Profile for Oronoco, Minnesota

Cities in Minnesota
Cities in Olmsted County, Minnesota
Zumbro River
Populated places established in 1854
Rochester metropolitan area, Minnesota
1854 establishments in Minnesota Territory